The 1959 South Australian state election was held on 7 March 1959.

Retiring Members

Labor

 James Stephens, MHA (Port Adelaide)

Liberal and Country

 Malcolm McIntosh, MHA (Albert)
 Geoffrey Clarke, MHA (Burnside)
 Rufus Goldney, MHA (Gouger)
 Ernest Anthoney, MLC (Central No.2 District)
 Collier Cudmore, MLC (Central No.2 District)
 Jack Bice, MLC (Southern District)
 John Cowan, MLC (Southern District)

House of Assembly
Sitting members are shown in bold text. Successful candidates are highlighted in the relevant colour. Where there is possible confusion, an asterisk (*) is also used.

Legislative Council
Sitting members are shown in bold text. Successful candidates are highlighted in the relevant colour and identified by an asterisk (*).

References

Candidates for South Australian state elections
1950 elections in Australia
1950s in South Australia